The Floating Mosque of Palu, also known as Arqam Babu Rahman Mosque is a mosque in the city of Palu, Central Sulawesi, Indonesia. The mosque is an icon of Palu, known for floating on Palu Bay. 

It was hit by the 2018 Sulawesi earthquake and tsunami and partially submerged underwater.

History
The Floating Mosque of Palu is inaugurated in 2011 in the area of 121 square meters, and known for directly facing Palu Bay on Talise beach. The mosque is a tourist destination and icon of the city of Palu. The mosque is dedicated to the 17th-century Muslim scholar from West Sumatra, Datuk Karama, who greatly contributed to the spread of Islam in the Palu region.

2018 Sulawesi tsunami

During the 2018 Sulawesi earthquake, the mosque was struck by multiple tsunamis which collapsed the pillars that supported the mosque floating on the bay. As such, the mosque has partially submerged in the ocean. However, the building remained intact. Reportedly, the wave entered through the back door and penetrated the front door, and the prayer space was inundated by the water. The window walls also lost their glasses. Adhan loudspeakers still functioned without any defects.

After the tsunami, the people of Palu, especially the traditionalist Muslims who believe in Islamic mysticism, asserted that the mosque survived because of the divine power of the saints who guarded the mosque. The floating mosque and the mosque of Alkhairaat traditionalist Islamic organization were few of the only surviving mosques after the tsunami.

As of April 2021, the mosque is still partially submerged underwater.

See also
Baiturrahim Mosque, another mosque that survived a tsunami

References

Buildings and structures in Central Sulawesi
Mosques completed in 2011
Mosques in Indonesia
Submerged buildings and structures